Mark Seth Yancy Fronda Fedelin  (born July 9, 2002, in Dasmariñas, Cavite), professionaly known as Seth Fedelin, is a Filipino actor, model, singer and dancer. Fedelin first appeared on television as a housemate on the reality show Pinoy Big Brother: Otso (2018). He has since appeared in various films and television series, such as Kadenang Ginto (2019) and Huwag Kang Mangamba (2021). He also starred in the iWantTFC film Wild Little Love (2019)

Life and career

Early life 
Fedelin was born on July 9, 2002, in Dasmariñas, Cavite to a Filipino-American mother, and a Filipino father. He is the eldest son among his siblings. He studied at Dasmariñas Integrated High School.

Pinoy Big Brother 
In 2018, Fedelin participated in the first batch of Pinoy Big Brother: Otso as a housemate, where he was evicted in the last eviction of that batch.

Acting career 
Fedelin appeared in various soap operas after his stint in Pinoy Big Brother, such as Kadenang Ginto and Huwag Kang Mangamba. The love team pairing of Francine Diaz and Seth Fedelin will be tested for the first time with their new drama series Dirty Linen by ABS-CBN and Dreamscape Entertainment this coming 2023.

Discography 
Kahit Na Anong Sabihin Ng Iba (The Gold Squad EP, 2019, Star Music)
Mamahalin Kita Palagi Lagi (2019, Star Music)
Liligawan Na Kita  (New Views, 2021, Star Music)

Kundi Ikaw  ( his  new single  in 2022, Star Music)

Muli 
(2022, Ace Banzuelo)

Filmography

Film

Television / Digital

Awards and nominations

See also 
Pinoy Big Brother: Otso

References

External links 
 
 

2002 births
Living people
ABS-CBN personalities
Filipino male film actors
Filipino male television actors
Male actors from Cavite
People from Dasmariñas
Pinoy Big Brother contestants
Star Magic
Filipino people of American descent